The ITF Women's Circuit is the second tier tour for women's professional tennis organised by the International Tennis Federation, and is the tier below the WTA Tour. In 2006, the ITF Women's Circuit included tournaments with prize money ranging from $10,000 to $75,000.

The ITF world champions in 2006 were Justine Henin (senior singles), Lisa Raymond / Samantha Stosur (senior doubles) and Anastasia Pavlyuchenkova (combined junior ranking).

Tournament breakdown by event category

Tournament breakdown by region

Singles titles by nation

This list displays only the top 20 nations in terms of singles titles wins.

Sources
List of ITF World Champions 
2006 ITF statistics summary
ITF pro circuit titles won by nations players in 2006

References

External links
International Tennis Federation (ITF) official website

 
ITF Women's World Tennis Tour
ITF Circuit
2006 in women's tennis